Billaea rutilans is a species of bristle fly in the family Tachinidae. It is a parasitoid of larval Prionus coriarius beetles, piercing the beetle near its spiracles.

References

Dexiinae
Insects described in 1844